"Hey Paula" is an American pop standard love song recorded by the singing duo Paul & Paula. It hit number one on the Billboard Hot 100 on the week ending February 9, 1963, and also made it to number one on the Hot R&B Singles chart. "Paul" was the song's writer, Ray Hildebrand, a student at Texas' Howard Payne University, a Baptist institution in the city of Brownwood. "Paula" was Jill Jackson, the niece of the owner of the boarding house where Ray lived.

Writing and recording
Hildebrand wrote the song, originally titled "Paul and Paula", taking inspiration from the Annette Funicello hit "Tall Paul". Hildebrand and Jackson performed the song on a local radio station and the song soon became popular enough for the duo to try to make a professional recording. They went to a studio in Fort Worth, Texas, and were fortunate enough to find a producer, Major Bill Smith, with studio time and musicians booked and a missing lead vocalist. He recorded their version of the song and released it on his Le Cam Records label, changing the name to "Hey Paula", credited to "Jill & Ray". When the record became a success, it was picked up by the larger Philips Records, which changed the billing to Paul and Paula. Musicians on the recording included Marvin Montgomery on guitar, Guy Parnell on bass, Hargus Robbins on organ, Little Caesar on piano, and Ronnie Dawson on drums.

Success
When the song was released on Philips, it hit the national charts in late 1962, reaching number one on both the pop and R&B charts in 1963. It spawned a follow-up top ten hit, "Young Lovers", and a series of other hits for the duo.

Chart performance

All-time charts

Cover versions
Australian personalities Ernie Sigley and Denise Drysdale scored a hit with the song in 1974. It was certified gold in Australia in October 1974. It was the 28th biggest selling single in Australia in 1974.

Popular culture
Boon (Peter Riegert) and Katy (Karen Allen) sang it to each other while high in the movie, National Lampoon's Animal House from 1978.
Eric Forman (Topher Grace) sang the song to his girlfriend Donna Pinciotti (Laura Prepon) during a friend's party in That 70s Show.

References

1963 singles
Billboard Hot 100 number-one singles
Cashbox number-one singles
Male–female vocal duets
Philips Records singles
1962 songs